The Minister of Human Resources and Social Development was a position in the Canadian government from 2006 to 2008. Its responsibilities are now split between:

 the Minister of Employment, Workforce Development and Disability Inclusion, and
 the Minister of Families, Children and Social Development

Former Canadian ministers